The Oranjewoud Palace is a palace and estate which gives its name to Oranjewoud in the Province of Friesland in the Netherlands.

Countess Albertine Agnes of Nassau, widow of William Frederick, Prince of Nassau-Dietz, acquired what was then known as the Schoterswoud at Heerenveen, an estate consisting of several fields, forests and buildings. She built a palace and gardens there, which after her death were inherited by John William Friso, Prince of Orange, who commissioned Daniel Marot to build the Paleis Oranjewoud. Work began in 1708 and continued under John William's wife Marie-Louise, but it was never completed and after a period of neglect it was terminated. The current house on the estate was built in 1829.

External links
http://www.lc.nl/friesland/ecoregio/article14769243.ece/Friesland-Bank-wordt-Frysl%C3%A2n-Boppe

Buildings and structures in Friesland